The 2019 Malaysia Cup group stage featured 16 teams and will start on 2 August. A total of 16 teams will compete in the group stage to decide the 8 places in the knockout stage of the 2019 Malaysia Cup.

Draw
The draw for the group stage was held on 23 July 2019, 12:00 MYT (UTC+8), at the Damansara Performing Arts Centre in Petaling Jaya, Selangor. The 16 teams were drawn into 4 groups. In the group stage, each group was played on a home-and-away round-robin basis. The winners and runners-up of each group advanced to the knockout stage.

Schedule
The schedule of each matchday is as follows.

Group

Group A

Group B

Group C

Group D

References

2019 in Malaysian football
Malaysia Cup seasons